The Garden of Aunt Isabel (Spanish: El jardín de la tía Isabel) is a 1971 Mexican historical drama film directed by Felipe Cazals and starring Jorge Martínez de Hoyos, Claudio Brook and Ofelia Guilmáin. During the early 16th century, two Spanish ships are wrecked on the Mexican coast. A group of survivors set out on a trek to try to locate a famed El Dorado.

Most of the locations used were around the Maya archeological zone near Tulum. Mayan pyramids are seen in the movie. Most of it in the last two scenes.

Cast 
 Jorge Martínez de Hoyos as Capitaine de Ballesteros
 Claudio Brook as Gonzalo de Medina
 Ofelia Guilmáin as Xeneta
 Gregorio Casal as Diego
  as Roderico
 Javier Esponda as Césat
 Augusto Benedico
 Julián Pastor
 Germán Robles
 Alfonso Arau
 Claudio Obregón
 Martha Navarro
 Roberto Dumont
 Juan Peláez
 Carlos Fernández
 Dunia Saldívar
 Pilar Sen
 Lilia Aragón
 Gastón Melo
 Héctor Ortega
 Roberto Rivero
 Jorge Rado
 Alfredo Torres
 Farnesio de Bernal
 Aarón Hernán
 Carlos Nieto
 Carlos Cardán
 Carlos Jordán
 Ramón Fernández
 Mario Castillón Bracho
 Patricia Ferrer
 Max Kerlow
 Carlos Agostí
 Nathanael León
 Luis del Río
 Ramón Menéndez
 José Vidal
 Hernando Name

References

Bibliography 
 Mora, Carl J. Mexican Cinema: Reflections of a Society, 1896-2004. McFarland & Co, 2005.

External links 
 

1971 films
1970s historical drama films
Mexican historical drama films
1970s Spanish-language films
Films directed by Felipe Cazals
Films set in the 16th century
Films set in Seville
Seafaring films
Films scored by Bernardo Segall
1971 drama films
1970s Mexican films